Yangjing may refer to these places in China:

Yangjing Subdistrict in Pudong District, Shanghai
Yangjing, Shaanxi in Dingbian County, Shaanxi

See also
Yang Jing (disambiguation)